D'Arros Island is part of the Amirante Islands group, which are in the Outer Islands (Coralline Seychelles) coral archipelago of the Seychelles islands and nation. The island is located west of the granitic Inner Seychelles archipelago, with a distance of 255 km south of Victoria, Seychelles.

History
The island was discovered in 1770 by European sailors.
D'Arros Island bears the name of the Baron d'Arros, Marine Commandant of Île de France (now Mauritius), from 1770 to 1771.
Private island
In 1975, The island became the property of prince Shahram Pahlavi Nia of Iran.
in 1998 it was bought by French billionaire Liliane Bettencourt (daughter of founder and main shareholder of L'Oreal) for US$18 million.
Nature preserve
In August 2012 it was revealed that the island had once more been sold, for US$60 million, to be managed by the Save Our Seas Foundation. In 2014, it was officially designated a nature reserve.

Geography

The land area of the island occupies .

Coral reefs
The island stands on the northern sector of the reef atoll.

Administration
The island belongs to Outer Islands District. 
Being an island with a small population, there are not any government buildings or services. For many services, people have to go to Victoria, which is a difficult task.

Demographics
The island has a population of 42. There are several buildings on the island, with one large house used by guests, who rented the island, and a number of smaller, permanently occupied houses for the staff. A small area of the island is cultivated for personal consumption of the residents.
The small village is on the north coast.

Flora & Fauna
Much of the island area is covered by vegetation. The vegetation is dominated by the native coconut palm (Cocos nucifera), and introduced horsetail beefwood (Casuarina equisetifolia) trees.

In 1965, five Seychelles fody (Foudia sechellarum) birds from Cousin Island were introduced to D'Arros and they have since increased to a population of a few hundred.

Transport
A  unpaved airstrip  bisects the island in the southwest. The island is occasionally serviced by an Island Development Company (IDC) aircraft from Mahé, or flights diverted from nearby Desroches.

Economics
The inhabitants on the island are engaged in very small scale farming and fishing which are mainly for the island consumption.

Image gallery

References

External links 

 Island guide 1
 Island guide 2
 National Bureau of Statistics
 Info on the island

Nature reserves
Private islands of Seychelles
Important Bird Areas of Seychelles
Islands of Outer Islands (Seychelles)